Hingol River or Hungol River is located in the Makran region, in the Gwadar District of southeastern Balochistan Province, in southwestern Pakistan.   The river and valley are protected within Hingol National Park.

Geography
It winds through the Makran Coastal Range and Hungol Valley between high cliffs.

The river flows all year long, unlike most other streams in Balochistan which only flow during rare rains.

See also 
List of rivers of Pakistan
Makran 
Geography of Balochistan, Pakistan

References 

Rivers of Balochistan (Pakistan)
Protected areas of Pakistan
Wetlands of Pakistan
Gwadar District
Natural history of Balochistan, Pakistan
Rivers of Pakistan